Pamphia was a village of ancient Aetolia, on the road from Metapa to Thermum, and distant 30 stadia from each. It was burnt by Philip V of Macedon in 218 BCE.

Its site is located near the modern Sitaralona.

References

Populated places in ancient Aetolia
Former populated places in Greece